A list of films produced in Poland in the 2000s.

External links
 Polish film at the Internet Movie Database

2000